Stephen Gilchrist is an English musician from London, England, who also teaches drums and guitar across London. He is best known as the drummer in Blur guitarist Graham Coxon's live band, and also appears on Coxon's live albums, Burnt to Bitz: At the Astoria and Live at the Zodiac, and on the single "Bloody Annoying / What Ya Gonna Do Now?".

Gilchrist supplied the drums for the Graham Coxon and Jimmy Pursey's single supporting the England national football team at the 2006 FIFA World Cup. The song was a re-working of the Sham 69 hit "Hurry Up Harry", and was released as "Sham 69 and The Special Assembly".  "Hurry Up England" entered the UK Singles Chart at #10. In 2013 he joined Art Brut, replacing founding member Mikey Breyer.

He has toured and recorded with Charlotte Hatherley, Cardiacs and Cathy Davey. He formerly wrote and recorded under the name Stuffy with his band Stuffy/the fuses. Stuffy/the fuses' second album, Angels Are Ace, was recorded by Steve Albini. He also releases music under the name Stephen EvEns.

Gilchrist endorses Sabian cymbals, Mapex Drums and Vic Firth sticks.

Gilchrist is the grandson of the conductor Kathleen Riddick.

Related bands
Other bands and musicians Gilchrist has played with include:
Doo The Moog
Art Brut
Hero Fisher
The Godfathers
Local Girls
Pop-A-Cat-A-Petal
Jennifer Gentle
Magoo
Conor Deasey (ex-Thrills)
Republica
Beachbuggy
Queenadreena
Chris T-T
Glam Chops
Fuck Off Piss Off
Keith John Adams
Quint (with Sally Young of Ut)
The Scaramanga Six
Sarandon
Vic Reeves & Bob Mortimer
Pierre Guimard
The Lightning Seeds
Alan Tyler & Sean Reed (ex-Rockin' Birds)
The Damned

References

External links
 Stephen Gilchrist on Myspace
Biography at Mapex Drums
Discogs.com

Year of birth missing (living people)
Living people
English drummers
British male drummers
Musicians from London